Bunker Hill is a location in Giles Co. TN. 

Notable people
 Bennie Brownlow, early baseball player and coach, born in Bunker Hill in 1886.
 Elam Stevenson, early 19th century Methodist preacher, lived here.

Unincorporated communities in Perry County, Tennessee
Unincorporated communities in Tennessee